Briercrest Christian Academy, formerly Caronport High School, is a private Christian high school located in Caronport, Saskatchewan. The school includes a student residence program and extracurricular activities such as sports, drama, art and music.  It is operated by Briercrest College and Seminary. It was founded in 1946, 11 years after the formation of the college and seminary.

References

External links
Caronport High School

Nondenominational Christian schools in Canada
High schools in Saskatchewan
Educational institutions established in 1946
1946 establishments in Saskatchewan